Leonard Eric Patterson is currently serving as the Director of the Federal Protective Service. Patterson is also a retired United States Air Force Brigadier General (Special Agent) and was the 14th Commander of the Air Force Office of Special Investigations (AFOSI), Andrews AFB, MD. As the AFOSI Commander, Patterson oversaw AFOSI's worldwide network of military and civilian special agents stationed at major Air Force installations and a variety of special operating locations.

Education
Patterson is a graduate of the Air Force Reserve Officer Training Corps at Howard University. He holds a Master of Business Administration from Webster University. Patterson is also a graduate of Squadron Officer School, Air Command and Staff College, Marine Corps Command and Staff College, and Air War College.

Military career
Patterson entered the United States Air Force in 1975 as a missile launch officer. He became an AFOSI special agent in 1979 and commanded AFOSI units at the detachment, squadron and regional levels at numerous stateside and overseas locations. He conducted and supervised a variety of felony-level investigations common to AFOSI, with specialization in counterintelligence and protective service operations as well as oversight of special programs. Prior to his last position as Commander of AFOSI, the general was the Operations Director for AFOSI. Patterson is a native of Washington, D.C.

Assignments
 September 1975 – December 1979, missile launch officer, Little Rock AFB, Ark. 
 December 1979 – October 1980, special agent, Air Force Office of Special Investigations, Langley AFB, Va. 
 October 1980 – October 1982, Commander, AFOSI Detachment 2101, Pope AFB, N.C. 
 October 1982 – October 1983, Chief of Counterintelligence, Collections and Protective Service Operations, AFOSI District 69, Ankara, Turkey 
 October 1983 – October 1985, Chief, Counterintelligence and Protective Service Operations Policy Branch, Headquarters AFOSI, Washington, D.C. 
 October 1985 – May 1989, assistant for Security Plans and Programs, Office of the Secretary of the Air Force, Washington, D.C. 
 May 1989 – May 1990, Commander, Air Force Element Counterintelligence Support Activity, AFOSI, Honduras 
 May 1990 – June 1992, Commander, AFOSI Detachment 540, Wright-Patterson Air Force Base, Ohio 
 June 1992 – June 1993, student, Air War College, Maxwell AFB, Ala. 
 June 1993 – July 1994, Vice Commander, Air Force Investigative Operations Center, Bolling AFB, Washington, D.C. 
 July 1994 – June 1996, Director of Security and Special Programs Oversight, Office of the Secretary of the Air Force, Washington, D.C. 
 August 1996 – July 1997, Commander, 52nd Field Investigations Squadron, AFOSI, Ankara, Turkey 
 July 1997 – July 1999, Commander, 2nd Field Investigations Region, Langley AFB, Va. 
 July 1999 – May 2001, Director of Operations, Headquarters AFOSI, Andrews AFB, Md. 
 May 2001 – June 2005, Commander, Headquarters AFOSI, Andrews AFB, Md.

Major awards and decorations 
Patterson is the recipient of the following:

Effective dates of promotion

Post-Military Career
After retiring from the U.S. Air Force, Patterson served in a variety of roles, such as a principal with Booz Allen Hamilton and Deputy Director of the Defense Counterintelligence and HUMINT Center at the Defense Intelligence Agency (DIA), where he directed and conducted counterintelligence and human intelligence activities worldwide to meet the Department of Defense requirements. In 2010, Patterson was appointed Director of the Federal Protective Service (FPS), which is a subcomponent of the National Protection and Programs Directorate (NPPD), and continues to work there serving his country.

See also
 Federal Protective Service
 List of Commanders of the Air Force Office of Special Investigations

References

Notes

External links 

 

Year of birth missing (living people)
Living people
Air Command and Staff College alumni
Air War College alumni
United States Department of Homeland Security
United States Department of Homeland Security officials
United States Air Force Office of Special Investigations
United States Air Force generals
Recipients of the Legion of Merit
Recipients of the Meritorious Service Medal (United States)
Squadron Officer School alumni
Webster University alumni